Maysky is a rural locality (a settlement) and the administrative center of Mayskoye Rural Settlement of Koshekhablsky District, Adygea, Russia. The population was 2403 as of 2018. There are 14 streets.

Geography 
Maysky is located 16 km south of Koshekhabl (the district's administrative centre) by road. Krasny is the nearest rural locality.

References 

Rural localities in Koshekhablsky District